Telephlebia undia is a species of dragonfly in the family Telephlebiidae,
known as the Carnarvon evening darner. 
It is a medium to large, dark chestnut brown dragonfly with dark markings on the leading edge and base of its wings.
It is endemic to the vicinity of Carnarvon National Park in Central Queensland, Australia, where it inhabits streams near waterfalls,
and flies at dusk.

Telephlebia undia appears similar to Telephlebia tryoni.

Gallery

See also
 List of Odonata species of Australia

References

Telephlebiidae
Odonata of Australia
Endemic fauna of Australia
Taxa named by Günther Theischinger
Insects described in 1985